The 1951–52 season was the 50th in the history of the Western Football League.

The champions for the first time in their history were Chippenham Town, and the winners of Division Two were Bideford Town.

Division One
Division One remained at eighteen members with two clubs promoted to replace Yeovil Town Reserves and Peasedown Miners Welfare who were relegated to Division Two.

Bath City Reserves, runners-up in Division Two
Stonehouse, champions of Division Two

Division Two
Division Two was reduced from twenty clubs to nineteen, after Stonehouse and Bath City Reserves were promoted to Division One, and National Smelting Company and Soundwell left the league. Three new clubs joined:

Gloucester City Reserves
Peasedown Miners Welfare, relegated from Division One.
Yeovil Town Reserves, relegated from Division One.

References

1951-52
4